"Ionych" is an 1898 short story by Anton Chekhov.

Publication
The story was published in the No. 9, September 1898 issue of the Monthly Literary Supplements to Niva magazine. In a slightly revised version, Chekhov included it into Volume 9 of the 1899–1901, first edition the Collected Works by A.P. Chekhov, published by Adolf Marks.

Background
The story, written in Nice, France, in the early 1898, was originally intended for Russkaya Mysl. Chekhov opted against sending the manuscript by post and, upon returning home, in May, handed it to Vukol Lavrov. Then he suddenly changed his mind and in a 6 June letter asked Viktor Goltsev to send it back, saying it was not fit for Russkaya Mysl. On 10 June he received the galley proofs and the same day sent it to Niva. This magazine's editor Rostislav Sementkovsky was apparently pleasantly surprised and flattered. "I've read your story with immense delight and, needless to say, all your wishes will be met," he wrote Chekhov in an 18 June letter.

Plot

Doctor Dmitry Ionovich Startsev comes to the provincial town S., to work for the local zemstvo. He starts visiting the Turkin family, considered to be the pride of the town, where the husband runs a small amateur theatre, the wife writes novels and their beautiful daughter Ekaterina (known informally as Kotik, which means Kittie) plays the piano, preparing herself for the conservatory. Unlike the majority of the townsfolk, Startsev does not take this acme of the local cultural life seriously, yet Kotik, full of charm, naivety and youthful spirits, easily conquers his heart. Before making the proposal, he even takes a midnight trip to the town's old graveyard where she'd jovially made a mock appointment with him, and even finds this silly adventure delightful. She is full of ambitions, though, and refuses him. For three days Startsev suffers greatly, then learns that she indeed had departed from the town to enroll into the conservatory, settles down into normalcy and soon all but forgets her, remembering his momentary madness with mild amusement.

Four years on, and Startsev is now a respected medical man, who owns a troika. Ekaterina returns to the town. She looks better than ever, and her musical ambitions are left behind. Still, the naivety and freshness are gone. As the two meet, she eagerly tries to re-awaken his interest in her, but Startsev remains unresponsive. Now everything about the family irritates him and he is very glad he'd not married. Ignoring her insistent attempts at making him again regular visitor, he never sets foot in the Turkin's house again.

Several more years pass. Startsev now is a rich man with vast practice, whose only enjoyments are playing Vint and collecting money from patients. In his troika, shouting at cabmen around him, he looks like a 'pagan god'. Owning two houses and an estate, he is now fat, irascible, and generally indifferent to the world around him. People refer to him as 'Ionych', which implies a mixture of familiarity and slight contempt. And the Turkins are the same as they were years before: the husband runs a little theatre, entertaining his guests with well-rehearsed humour, the wife reads aloud her novels, and Ekaterina still likes to play her piano very loud. It's just that she looks now much older and, her health deteriorating, each autumn takes a trip to the Crimea.

Reception
The story was warmly received. The most detailed and, in retrospect, insightful review came from D.N. Ovsyaniko-Kulikovsky, who, writing for Zhurnal Dlya Vsekh, hailed Chekhov as "an independent force blazing in literature the trail of its own". The critic subjected to thorough analysis Chekhov's method who "...never gives us a well-worked, all-round portrait of his characters... Just provides one, two, three strokes and then backs this sketch up with a kind of see-through, unusually subtle and to shrewd psychological analysis". Ovsyaniko-Kulikovsky considered "Ionych" the most perfect, complete example of Chekhov's art.

Notes

References

External links
 Ионыч, the original Russian text
 Ionych, the English translation

Short stories by Anton Chekhov
1898 short stories
Works originally published in Russian magazines